Gasan Jōseki (峨山韶碩 1275–23 November 1366) was a Japanese Soto Zen monk. He was a disciple of Keizan Jokin, and his disciples included Bassui Tokushō, Taigen Sōshin, Tsūgen Jakurei, Mutan Sokan, Daisetsu Sōrei, and Jippō Ryōshū.

1275 births
1366 deaths
Zen Buddhist monks
Japanese Buddhist clergy
Soto Zen Buddhists
Kamakura period Buddhist clergy